Lorenzo Orr (born January 20, 1971) is a former American professional basketball player who had 12-year career in Europe. He played college basketball for USC Trojans.

References

External links
http://www.uhlife.com/trainers-minneapolis-lorenzo-orr/ 
Lorenzo Orr Player Profile, Andrezieux Boutheon Loire Sud Basket, News, Stats - Eurobasket
Lorenzo Orr autographed Basketball Card (USC) 1995 Classic Rookie at Amazon's Sports Collectibles Store

1971 births
Living people
American expatriate basketball people in France
American expatriate basketball people in Portugal
American expatriate basketball people in North Macedonia
American expatriate basketball people in Switzerland
Centers (basketball)
Power forwards (basketball)
Basketball players from Detroit
USC Trojans men's basketball players
American men's basketball players